Heldur Jõgioja (21 September 1936 Elva – 21 April 2010 Tartu) was an Estonian musician, composer, writer, journalist.

Jõgioja graduated from the Faculty of Law of Tartu State University in 1964. Aftwewards, he worked as a lawyer in Kohtla-Järve and Tartu and worked as a reporter for Õhtuleht. In 1974, he joined the musical ensemble Suveniir as a keyboardist and accordionist. In total, he created about 300 songs and more than 1000 song texts. He also published collections of poetry, wrote historical plays, novels and short stories. He was the owner of the record label LeHelMus.

Awards
 Order of the White Star, V class.

Selected books
 Eesti Rukki Seltsi laulik. Kirjastus LeHelMus. ISBN 9790540020859
 Kaika Lainest Vangani. ISBN 9789949159260
 Kriminaalne tragikomöödia. ISBN 9789949187775
 Himmleri Tartust pärit ihuarst. Kirjastus LeHelMus. ISBN 9789949188598

References

1936 births
2010 deaths
Estonian composers
20th-century Estonian composers
Estonian male novelists
Estonian male poets
Estonian male short story writers
20th-century Estonian writers
20th-century Estonian musicians
Estonian songwriters
Estonian journalists
20th-century Estonian lawyers
Recipients of the Order of the White Star, 4th Class
University of Tartu alumni
People from Elva, Estonia